The following is an incomplete list of classical music festivals – music festivals focused on classical music. Classical music is art music produced or rooted in the traditions of Western music (both liturgical and secular), and has long been played at festival-like settings. It encompasses a broad span of time from roughly the 11th century to the present day. The major time divisions of classical music are as follows: the early music period, which includes the Medieval (500–1400) and the Renaissance (1400–1600) era, played at early music festivals; the common practice period, which includes the Baroque (1600–1750), Classical (1750–1830), and Romantic eras (1804–1910), which included opera festivals and choral festivals; and the 20th century (1901–2000) which includes the modern (1890–1930) that overlaps from the late 19th-century, the high modern (mid 20th-century), and contemporary classical music festivals or postmodern (1975–2000) eras, the last of which overlaps into the 21st-century. The term "classical music" did not appear until the early 19th century, in an attempt to distinctly canonize the period from Johann Sebastian Bach to Beethoven as a golden age.

Related lists, categories, and media

Festivals

Africa

Asia

Europe

North America

Oceania

South America

References

External links